This is a list of German television related events from 1974.

Events
7 July - West Germany beat the Netherlands 2-1 to win the 1974 World Cup at Munich.

Debuts

ARD
 21 January – Gemeinderätin Schumann (1974)
 2 May – Die Fälle des Herrn Konstantin (1974–1977)
 1 June – Lokalseite unten links (1974–1977)
 9 October – Die Powenzbande (1974)
 26 November – Münchner Geschichten 1974–1975)
 12 December – Unter einem Dach (1974–1976)
 14 December –  (1974–1975)

ZDF
 7 January – 
 Engadiner Bilderbogen (1974)
 Zwischenstationen (1974)
 12 January – Hauptsache, die Kohlen stimmen (1974)
 7 February – Alexander und die Töchter  (1974)
 20 February – Sergeant Berry (1974–1976)
 7 April – Der kleine Doktor (1974)
 19 May – Hier kocht der Chef (1974)
 22 August – Der Herr Kottnik (1974)
 28 August – Dr. med. Mark Wedmann - Detektiv inbegriffen (1974)
 15 October – Das Blaue Palais (1974–1976)
 20 October – Derrick (1974–1998)
 26 November – Die lieben Haustiere (1974)

DFF
 2 May – Maria und der Paragraph (1974)
 27 October – Der Leutnant vom Schwanenkietz (1974)

Television shows

1950s
Tagesschau (1952–present)

1960s
 heute (1963-present)

Ending this year

Births
5 March – Barbara Schöneberger, actress, singer & TV host
22 July – Franka Potente, actress

Deaths